Hedwigia ciliata is a species of moss belonging to the family Hedwigiaceae.

It has cosmopolitan distribution.

References

Bryopsida